Telestes montenigrinus is a species of ray-finned fish in the family Cyprinidae. It is found in Albania and Serbia and Montenegro.

Its natural habitats are rivers and intermittent freshwater lakes. It is not considered threatened by the IUCN.

References

Telestes
Freshwater fish of Europe
Fish of Europe
Fish described in 1963
Taxonomy articles created by Polbot